The Peshmerga Rojava, also known as Rojava Peshmerga, are the military wing of the Kurdish National Council in Syria.

History 
The KNC leader claimed that in response to the rising military power of the YPG and YPJ, the armed wings of the PYD, the KNC formed its own paramilitary wing, the Peshmerga Rojava. According to the claims of Ibrahim Biro, the Rojava Peshmergas are mostly recruited from Syrian Kurdish refugees and Syrian Army deserters in Kurdistan Region. Trained by Peshmerga and Zeravani under Major General Bahjat Taymas, the Rojava Peshmerga had a claimed strength of 3,000 fighters by June 2016 and 5,000 by December 2018. Their primary purpose has been defending Kurdish areas, and fighting the Islamic State.

Battles 
Between 2016 and 2018, the Rojava Peshmergas were mostly fighting ISIL in Iraq.

On 2 March 2017, there were clashes between the Rojava Peshmerga and Yazidi militias affiliated with PKK in Sinjar resulting in the deaths of five as well as two militants affiliated to the PKK who attempted to prevent the clashes. At least four Peshmergas were also injured in the clashes.

In the Second Libyan Civil War, Ahmed al-Mismari, spokesman for Khalifa Haftar's Libyan National Army, criticised the transfer of fighters from Turkey to Libya. He alleged that among the Turkish-backed militias sent to Libya to support the National Salvation Government are members of the Rojava Peshmerga and Grey Wolves. He even alleged that the Rojava Peshmerga received training from the MIT.

Conflict with other Kurdish groups 
Due to the political tensions between the PYD and the KNC, and low manpower compared to the YPG, the Rojava Peshmerga have not been able to enter Rojava. In the course of the Siege of Kobanî, the KNC offered to send 200 fighters to support the city's defenses, but its offer was rejected by the PYD as the latter wanted all Kurdish units to fight as part of the YPG and the YPJ. The KNC leader has several times claimed that the YPG even blocked the Rojava Peshmerga who had been trained in Iraqi Kurdistan from entering Rojava at all. Since the formation of the SDF, the YPG officials have stated that the Rojava Peshmergas are welcome to join and fight under SDF command. The KNC have so far rejected joining SDF, and stated that "they [the SDF] have a good relation with the Syrian regime, that's why we cannot join them." Despite their tensions with the PYD, however, the KNC has also rejected inquires of Syrian opposition groups to send the Rojava Peshmerga to Azaz to defend the city against both ISIL as well as the YPG during the Northern Aleppo offensive. Bahjat Taymas declared that the Rojava Peshmerga "don't want to fight Kurds, only ISIS."

After the PKK called the Peshmerga Rojava "mercenaries", Haji Kalo, one of Peshmerga Rojava's leaders, said that "mercenaries is only applicable to the PKK, the Rojava Pesmerga just wants to serve Kurdistan".

On 17 December 2018, US envoy to Syria James Franklin Jeffrey informed the press that some Rojava Peshmergas have been deployed across the Iraq–Syria border. The disputes between the PYD and the KNC, however, prevent the Rojava Peshmergas from entering Rojava despite the involvement of the international community. One of the main obstacles have been the KNC's links with Turkey and the fear of local people believed to be PYD-supporters that the Peshmergas could be used against Rojava in future. The KNC states that the PYD oppose Rojava peshmerga because they want to maintain monopoly on power and that the PYD fears that the Rojava peshmerga could hinder the PYD's enforcement of authoritarian rule over Kurdish areas in Syria. While described as mercenaries for Turkey by pro-PYD supporters, the Rojava peshmerga and their KNC administration in turn accuse the PYD of being mercenaries for Iran and too close to Assad whose family has oppressed Kurds for half a century. They explain their own links to Turkey as a geopolitical necessity if Kurds in Syria are to gain autonomy from Damascus.

References 

Kurdish nationalism in Syria
Kurdish nationalism in Iraq
Kurdish nationalist organizations
Kurdish secession in Syria
Organizations based in Syria
Kurdish organisations
Military wings of nationalist parties
Syrian Kurdish organizations
Peshmerga
tr:Peşmerge Rojava